"Anthology of Interest II" is the 18th episode of Futuramas third season . It originally aired on the Fox network in the United States on January 6, 2002. This episode, as well as the earlier "Anthology of Interest I", serves to showcase three "imaginary" stories.

Plot
Professor Farnsworth hauls out his What-If Machine again, fine-tunes it, and the crew takes a look at three alternative realities.

I, Meatbag
Bender asks what would happen if he were human. The simulation opens with Professor Farnsworth announcing that he has invented a process of reverse fossilization, which can turn robots and machines into organic life-forms. He uses his process on Bender, who is transformed into a human. After a short period of adaptation, Bender's self-control is overwhelmed by his new senses of taste and touch, and he goes on a binge of eating, smoking, partying, and drinking alcohol.

A week later, at the Nobel Prize judging, the Professor presents Bender, who is now morbidly obese and in terrible health. The committee initially condemns Farnsworth, but Bender begs them to consider his lifestyle. This inspires the scientists to spend the night in a state of wild hedonism. The next morning, the hungover committee awards Bender the Nobel Prize in Chemistry, but discovers that he died shortly after the party began. The Planet Express crew then sadly roll away Bender's corpse.

Raiders of the Lost Arcade
Fry asks to see a world that is more like a video game. As the simulation starts, President of Earth Richard Nixon is preparing to sign a treaty with Ambassador Kong of planet Nintenduu 64. Ambassador Kong attacks Nixon, and a state of war erupts.

Due to his extensive knowledge of video games from the twentieth century, Fry is brought into the Milatari headquarters and introduced to General Colin Pac-Man. Before Fry can impart his wisdom to the military, the Nintendians launch an attack on Washington, D.C., and they are forced into the escape tunnels, which resemble a Pac-Man board.

They emerge outside the Planet Express building, where the Nintendian invaders, led by Lrrr, are laying waste to New New York. Fry situates himself at the controls of a rolling anti-aircraft artillery platform, and begins destroying the alien ships in a manner similar to Space Invaders. Fry is unable to destroy the final ship, which lands nearby. The Nintendians emerge and demand "a million allowances' worth of quarters" with which to do their laundry. The crew initially refuse, but then the Nintendians suggest if they would be allowed to throw their laundry in with Earth's as a compromise, to which the crew agrees.

Wizzin'
Leela asks what if she found her true home. However, when the lever is pulled to start the simulation, it hits Leela on the head and knocks her unconscious, prompting her to dream a parody of The Wizard of Oz with Leela as Dorothy, Nibbler as Toto, Amy as Glinda the Good Witch, Fry as the Scarecrow, Bender as the Tin Man, Zoidberg as the Cowardly Lion, and Professor Fansworth as the Wizard.

Leela and Nibbler, while riding in the Planet Express ship, are taken by tornado to Oz. The ship's landing gear lands on the Wicked Witch of the East, killing her. Leela takes the witch's magic boots from her corpse and puts them on, since it is hard to find footwear in her size. She asks Amy for help getting back home, and Amy tells her that only the Professor at the Emerald Laboratory can send her home. Leela is joined in her quest by Fry, Bender, and Zoidberg. They all are captured by Wicked Witch Mom, who asks Leela to be her witch daughter. Leela happily agrees, but when Bender pops opens a celebratory bottle of champagne, the spilled liquid causes Mom to melt into nothing. They resume their journey to the Emerald Laboratory, where the Professor tells Leela to click her boot heels together and wish to be sent back home. Instead, she uses them to become a witch and turns Fry, Bender and the Professor into toads. However, a toilet overflow in the upstairs bathroom (caused by Zoidberg's use of it) leaks through the ceiling and onto Leela, causing her to melt. She wakes up to find Bender splashing water in her face and berates the crew for showing up in her wonderful dream and ruining it. The Professor is disappointed to see Leela alive, as he had intended to harvest her organs.

Cultural references

I, Meatbag
In a split-second establishing shot of New New York before the Professor's press conference, the towers of the World Trade Center are seen. This episode aired on January 6, 2002, about 4 months after the towers were destroyed.
The song that Bender becomes infatuated with as a human is "Conga" by Gloria Estefan. The title of the segment is a nod to the Isaac Asimov collection of short stories I, Robot.

Raiders of the Lost Arcade

The "Raiders of the Lost Arcade" segment is a "non-stop barrage of game references" with jokes and allusions referencing a wide array of classic video games. The title is a reference to the 1981 film Raiders of the Lost Ark. The segment starts off with a sequence from Asteroids. "Ambassador Kong" is a reference to the arcade game Donkey Kong, as is Italy's ambassador to the U.N. being Mario. The maze which the characters run through is a homage to the Pac-Man series. The crew exits the maze through a warp pipe from Super Mario Bros. The Nintendians' fleet is composed of ships based on the aliens from the Space Invaders series, which move in the same pattern as those in the video game ("Drop down, increase speed, and reverse direction!"). Fry plays to the accompaniment of a cassette tape of "Tom Sawyer" by Rush. The planet Nintendu 64 is a reference to the game console Nintendo 64. When the Milatari HQ is first shown, the green tank from Battlezone is driving past. When the characters walk through the HQ, they go past doors labelled Moon Patrol and Missile Command. As the Nintendians (Lrrr, Donkey Kong, a Berzerk robot, a Robotron brain, BurgerTimes Mr. Egg, and Q*bert) exit the landed ship, one of them says the phrase "All your base are belong to us", a phrase originating from Zero Wing.

Wizzin'
The majority of the plot is a direct parody of the 1939 film The Wizard of Oz, with Leela taking the place of Dorothy, Amy as the Good Witch of the North, Fry as the Scarecrow, Bender as the Tin Man, Zoidberg as the Cowardly Lion, Professor Farnsworth as the Wizard and Mom as the Wicked Witch of the West. When Leela first exits the spaceship, a parody of the NBC peacock logo is seen spreading its feathers. While skipping Fry says “I got to pull over and take The Wiz,” in reference to The Wiz, a 1978 remake of the original film. Fry attempts to scare a crow by a reading an excerpt of the Stephen King book Christine.

Reception
In 2006, IGN.com ranked this episode as the series' twelfth best, with "Anthology of Interest I" at number 13, in their list of the "Top 25 Futurama episodes". Zack Handlen of The A.V. Club gave the episode a B.
In its initial airing, the episode received a Nielsen rating of 4.5, placing it 62nd among primetime shows for the week of December 31, 2001 – January 6, 2002.

See also
Pixels (2015 film), a film with a storyline similar to "Raiders of the Lost Arcade"

References

External links

Anthology of Interest II at The Infosphere.

Futurama (season 3) episodes
2002 American television episodes
Fictional video games
Parodies of films
Parodies of video games
The Wizard of Oz (1939 film)
Television episodes written by David X. Cohen
Parody television episodes
Television episodes about video games